Divorce Coupons is a 1922 American silent drama film directed by Webster Campbell and starring Corinne Griffith, Holmes Herbert and Cyril Ring.

Cast
 Corinne Griffith as Linda Catherton 
 Holmes Herbert as Roland Bland 
 Mona Lisa as Ishtar Lane 
 Diana Allen as Teddy Beaudine 
 Cyril Ring as Conrad Fontaine 
 Vincent Coleman as Buddy

References

Bibliography
 Munden, Kenneth White. The American Film Institute Catalog of Motion Pictures Produced in the United States, Part 1. University of California Press, 1997.

External links

1922 films
1922 drama films
Silent American drama films
Films directed by Webster Campbell
American silent feature films
1920s English-language films
Vitagraph Studios films
American black-and-white films
1920s American films